An equestrian statue of George Washington by Daniel Chester French is installed in Paris, France.

External links
 

Equestrian statues in France
Monuments and memorials in France
Outdoor sculptures in France
Sculptures by Daniel Chester French
Sculptures in Paris
Statues of George Washington